Glycythyma is a genus of moths of the family Crambidae.

Species
Glycythyma chrysorycta (Meyrick, 1884)
Glycythyma leonina (Butler, 1886)
Glycythyma thymedes Turner, 1908
Glycythyma xanthoscota (Lower, 1903)

References

Spilomelinae
Crambidae genera
Taxa named by Alfred Jefferis Turner